Qeshlaq-e Hajj Fathali Mansur (also Romanized as Qeshlāq-e Ḩājj Fatḥʿalī Manṣūr) is a village in Qeshlaq-e Shomali Rural District, in the Central District of Parsabad County, Ardabil Province, Iran. At the 2006 census, its population was 50, in 10 families.

References 

Towns and villages in Parsabad County